In only their third Games the British overseas territory of Anguilla was represented at the 2006 Commonwealth Games in Melbourne by a six-member contingent, comprising six sportspersons and no officials. They competed in five events in cycling and athletics. They won no medals.

Competitors

The following is the list of number of competitors participating in the Games.

Athletics

Women
Track

Field

Key
Note–Ranks given for track events are within the athlete's heat only

Cycling

Road

Men

References

 

2006
Nations at the 2006 Commonwealth Games
Commonwealth Games